TC Pista is a stock car racing series in Argentina, created by the Asociación Corredores de Turismo Carretera in 1995. Its purpose was to prepare pilots from regional categories who wish to compete in Turismo Carretera. It also made it possible to absorb those pilots who did not fit on the TC grid when they went from using road circuits to permanent road courses. This division has the same regulations as the major division, but differs in the preparation of its cars, these being of lower power.

Until 2015, the four TC brands have distributed their titles as follows: Ford achieved the highest award 11 times, Chevrolet achieved 6 crowns, while Dodge obtained 5 crowns and Torino 3 crowns.

Currently, the championship is defined by means of a Play Off system implemented by ACTC, which puts into play the Río Uruguay Seguros Silver Cup and also grants a limited number of promotions to the higher category.

Champions

References

Auto racing series in Argentina
Stock car racing series
Asociación Corredores de Turismo Carretera
1995 establishments in Argentina
Recurring sporting events established in 1995